Physical Culture Palace was the first sports governing body in the state. It acted from 1932 to 1940 in Kaunas, Lithuania. Currently the building serves as a Lithuanian Sports University central palace.

References

Sports governing bodies in Lithuania
Sport in Kaunas
History of Kaunas